RNIB Pears Centre for Specialist Learning was a school and children’s home for young people who are blind or partially sighted and who also have multiple disabilities or complex needs such as severe or profound learning disabilities, physical disabilities, additional sensory impairment, healthcare needs and autistic spectrum disorders. The school was run by RNIB (Royal National Institute of Blind People). It was based just outside Coventry.

The children's home at RNIB Pears Centre offered up to 52-week specialised residential care from new purpose-built bungalows with gardens and outdoor play areas. The children's home supported young people from ages 0–19 years, whether or not they attended the school and each young person had their own bedroom which was made safe and personal to them. RNIB Pears Centre also offered individually tailored therapies from an in-house team of therapists and healthcare consultants, including behavioural specialists trained in the care of people with learning disabilities, nurses, physiotherapists and speech and language therapists.

RNIB Pears Centre was categorised by Ofsted as a special, non-maintained school for 2- to 19-year-olds and as a children's home. Each service was inspected independently of one another by Ofsted. The children's home was rated as 'Outstanding' by Ofsted in November 2011. The school also achieved an 'Outstanding' Ofsted grading in February 2013, but in November 2017 it was graded as inadequate. 
On Tuesday 4 September 2018 the RNIB announced both the children's home and school will close on 7 November 2018, as the RNIB closed the children's home on site.
  
The school was previously known as Rushton Hall School and then RNIB Rushton School and Children's Home. In May 2011 the name changed to RNIB Pears Centre for Specialist Learning – the new name reflected the donation and support given to the school by the Pears Foundation.

History
The school was founded in 1957, at Rushton Hall in Northamptonshire. In 2002, the school moved to a shared site with Exhall Grange School in Coventry.

In 2005, planning began for a major redevelopment of the entire school site. The redevelopment was finished in 2012.

Redevelopment
Planning to redevelop the site began in 2005 and work started in 2009. The first phase of work was completed during 2011. This involved a new school, five new bungalows and a new reception/administration building.

The second phase was completed in 2012. Empty buildings were knocked down and the site landscaped. The centre was officially opened on 13 September 2012 by The Princess Royal. Further development in the future may include more accommodation, a hydrotherapy suite and a swimming pool.

Rushton and Pears
In May 2011, Rushton School and Children's Home was renamed RNIB Pears Centre for Specialist Learning.  This is due to the Pears Foundation's investment of £1.1 million towards the redevelopment work.

References

External links 
 RNIB Pears Centre for Specialist Learning on the RNIB website

Schools for people on the autistic spectrum
Schools for the blind in the United Kingdom
Defunct schools in Warwickshire
Educational institutions established in 1957
1957 establishments in England
Defunct special schools in England